Boletinellus is a genus of fungi in the family Boletinellaceae (suborder Sclerodermatineae of the Boletales). The genus was first described by American mycologist William Alphonso Murrill in 1909.

References

External links

Boletales
Boletales genera
Taxa named by William Alphonso Murrill